Road Rules: USA – The First Adventure is the inaugural season of the MTV reality television series Road Rules. The show featured five young people traveling the country, completing various tasks to get their next clue to their next mission.

Cast

Task list

Episodes

After filming
In 2015, Kit Hoover and Mark Long reunited on Access Hollywood for the 20 years anniversary of the series.

In 2020, Mark Long started asking his followers if they'd be interested in seeing former cast members of The Challenge coming together for a new version of the series. After his idea went viral, he announced a partnership with Bunim/Murray Productions to further develop his project. The Challenge: All Stars eventually premiered on Paramount+ on April 1, 2021. The series was renewed for a second season, which premiered on November 11, 2021. Long also partnered up with Objective Media Group to develop a cooking competition series. In 2022, he competed on the 24th season of Worst Cooks in America.

The Challenge

Challenge in bold indicates that the contestant was a finalist on The Challenge.

Note: Mark Long served as a co-host on Real World/Road Rules Challenge: Battle of the Seasons.

References

External links

Road Rules
English-language television shows
1995 American television seasons